Mick Walker (born 27 November 1940) is an English former football player and manager. As a player, he started his career as an apprentice with Nottingham Forest and played non-league football for several clubs including Kettering Town and Matlock Town. He later became manager of the reserve team at Ilkeston Town before being appointed first-team manager in 1971 following the departure of Dave Agnew. Six months later, Walker was hired as manager of the Singapore national football team. He joined Burton Albion as manager in 1976 and spent two years in charge of the club, later joining the coaching staff at Notts County.

Walker had a spell as manager of Notts County, succeeding Neil Warnock in January 1993. He was fired in September 1994. He later worked on the staff of Leeds United, where he was the chief scout as of 2010.

References

External links

1940 births
Living people
People from Belper
Footballers from Derbyshire
English footballers
Nottingham Forest F.C. players
Kettering Town F.C. players
Matlock Town F.C. players
English football managers
Ilkeston Town F.C. managers
Singapore national football team managers
Burton Albion F.C. managers
Notts County F.C. managers
English Football League managers
Association footballers not categorized by position